Cape Disappointment can refer to:
 Cape Disappointment (Washington), at the mouth of the Columbia River in western Washington State
 Cape Disappointment State Park, a state park occupying most of Cape Disappointment commemorating its historical significance
 Cape Disappointment (South Georgia)
 Cape Disappointment (South Orkney Islands)
 Cape Disappointment (Antarctica)